USB 3.0, released in November 2008, is the third major version of the Universal Serial Bus (USB) standard for interfacing computers and electronic devices. Among other improvements, USB 3.0 adds the new transfer rate referred to as SuperSpeed USB (SS) that can transfer data at up to 5 Gbit/s (500 MB/s after encoding overhead), which is about 10 times faster than Hi-Speed (maximum for USB 2.0 standard). It is recommended that manufacturers distinguish USB 3.0 connectors from their USB 2.0 counterparts by using blue color for the Standard-A receptacles and plugs, and by the initials SS.

USB 3.1, released in July 2013, is the successor standard that replaces the USB 3.0 standard.  USB 3.1 preserves the existing SuperSpeed transfer rate, giving it the new label USB 3.1 Gen 1, while defining a new SuperSpeed+ transfer mode, called USB 3.1 Gen 2 which can transfer data at up to 10 Gbit/s over the existing USB3-type-A and USB-C connectors (1200 MB/s after encoding overhead, more than twice the rate of USB 3.0).

USB 3.2, released in September 2017,  replaces the USB 3.1 standard. It preserves existing USB 3.1 SuperSpeed and SuperSpeed+ data modes and introduces two new SuperSpeed+ transfer modes over the USB-C connector using two-lane operation, with data rates of 10 and 20 Gbit/s (1200 and 2400 MB/s after encoding overhead). This specification has been renamed to reflect the evolution of "generations" of USB standards (i.e.: USB3.2Gen1 is "SuperSpeed", USB3.2Gen2 is also "SuperSpeed", but 2x faster, USB3.2Gen2x2 is also marketed as "SuperSpeed" but is 4x faster than 3.2Gen1). Nomenclature has been broadly criticized by both experts in the industry and the public at large for its confusing revisions not reasonably or appropriately reflecting the marketing messages that the guidelines prescribe in the standard specification, which is published at usb.org

Overview
The USB 3.0 specification is similar to USB 2.0, but with many improvements and an alternative implementation. Earlier USB concepts such as endpoints and the four transfer types (bulk, control, isochronous and interrupt) are preserved but the protocol and electrical interface are different. The specification defines a physically separate channel to carry USB 3.0 traffic. The changes in this specification make improvements in the following areas:
 Transfer speed USB 3.0 adds a new transfer type called SuperSpeed or SS, 5 Gbit/s (electrically, it is more similar to PCI Express 2.0 and SATA than USB 2.0)
 Increased bandwidth USB 3.0 uses two unidirectional data paths instead of only one: one to receive data and the other to transmit
 Power management U0 to U3 link power management states are defined
 Improved bus use a new feature is added (using packets NRDY and ERDY) to let a device asynchronously notify the host of its readiness, with no need for polling
 Support for rotating media the bulk protocol is updated with a new feature called Stream Protocol that allows a large number of logical streams within an Endpoint

USB 3.0 has transmission speeds of up to 5 Gbit/s or 5000 Mbit/s, about ten times faster than USB 2.0 (0.48 Gbit/s) even without considering that USB 3.0 is full duplex whereas USB 2.0 is half duplex.  This gives USB 3.0 a potential total bidirectional bandwidth twenty times greater than USB 2.0. Considering flow control, packet framing and protocol overhead, applications can expect 450 MB/s of bandwidth.

Architecture and features

In USB 3.0, dual-bus architecture is used to allow both USB 2.0 (Full Speed, Low Speed, or High Speed) and USB 3.0 (SuperSpeed) operations to take place simultaneously, thus providing backward compatibility. The structural topology is the same, consisting of a tiered star topology with a root hub at level 0 and hubs at lower levels to provide bus connectivity to devices.

Data transfer and synchronization
The SuperSpeed transaction is initiated by a host request, followed by a response from the device. The device either accepts the request or rejects it; if accepted, the device sends data or accepts data from the host. If the endpoint is halted, the device responds with a STALL handshake. If there is lack of buffer space or data, it responds with a Not Ready (NRDY) signal to tell the host that it is not able to process the request. When the device is ready, it sends an Endpoint Ready (ERDY) to the host which then reschedules the transaction.

The use of unicast and the limited amount of multicast packets, combined with asynchronous notifications, enables links that are not actively passing packets to be put into reduced power states, which allows better power management.

Data encoding
The "SuperSpeed" bus provides for a transfer mode at a nominal rate of 5.0 Gbit/s, in addition to the three existing transfer modes. Accounting for the encoding overhead, the raw data throughput is 4 Gbit/s, and the specification considers it reasonable to achieve 3.2 Gbit/s (400 MB/s) or more in practice.

All data is sent as a stream of eight-bit (one-byte) segments that are scrambled and converted into 10-bit symbols via 8b/10b encoding; this helps prevent transmissions from generating electromagnetic interference (EMI). Scrambling is implemented using a free-running linear feedback shift register (LFSR). The LFSR is reset whenever a COM symbol is sent or received. 

Power and charging
As with earlier versions of USB, USB 3.0 provides power at 5 volts nominal. The available current for low-power (one unit load) SuperSpeed devices is 150 mA, an increase from the 100 mA defined in USB 2.0. For high-power SuperSpeed devices, the limit is six unit loads or 900 mA (4.5 W)—almost twice USB 2.0's 500 mA.

USB 3.0 ports may implement other USB specifications for increased power, including the USB Battery Charging Specification for up to 1.5 A or 7.5 W, or, in the case of USB 3.1, the USB Power Delivery Specification for charging the host device up to 100 W.

Availability

The USB 3.0 Promoter Group announced on 17 November 2008 that the specification of version 3.0 had been completed and had made the transition to the USB Implementers Forum (USB-IF), the managing body of USB specifications. This move effectively opened the specification to hardware developers for implementation in future products.

The first USB 3.0 consumer products were announced and shipped by Buffalo Technology in November 2009, while the first certified USB 3.0 consumer products were announced on 5 January 2010, at the Las Vegas Consumer Electronics Show (CES), including two motherboards by Asus and Gigabyte Technology.

Manufacturers of USB 3.0 host controllers include, but are not limited to, Renesas Electronics, Fresco Logic, ASMedia, Etron, VIA Technologies, Texas Instruments, NEC and Nvidia. As of November 2010, Renesas and Fresco Logic have passed USB-IF certification.  Motherboards for Intel's Sandy Bridge processors have been seen with Asmedia and Etron host controllers as well. On 28 October 2010, Hewlett-Packard released the HP Envy 17 3D featuring a Renesas USB 3.0 host controller several months before some of their competitors. AMD worked with Renesas to add its USB 3.0 implementation into its chipsets for its 2011 platforms. At CES2011, Toshiba unveiled a laptop called "Toshiba Qosmio X500" that included USB 3.0 and Bluetooth 3.0, and Sony released a new series of Sony VAIO laptops that would include USB 3.0. As of April 2011, the Inspiron and Dell XPS series were available with USB 3.0 ports, and, as of May 2012, the Dell Latitude laptop series were as well; yet the USB root hosts failed to work at SuperSpeed under Windows 8.

Adding to existing equipment

Additional power for multiple ports on a laptop PC may be derived in the following ways:
 Some ExpressCard-to-USB 3.0 adapters may connect by a cable to an additional USB 2.0 port on the computer, which supplies additional power.
 The ExpressCard may have a socket for an external power supply.
 If the external device has an appropriate connector, it can be powered by an external power supply.
 USB 3.0 port provided by an ExpressCard-to-USB 3.0 adapter may be connected to a separately-powered USB 3.0 hub, with external devices connected to that USB 3.0 hub.

On the motherboards of desktop PCs which have PCI Express (PCIe) slots (or the older PCI standard), USB 3.0 support can be added as a PCI Express expansion card. In addition to an empty PCIe slot on the motherboard, many "PCI Express to USB 3.0" expansion cards must be connected to a power supply such as a Molex adapter or external power supply, in order to power many USB 3.0 devices such as mobile phones, or external hard drives that have no power source other than USB; as of 2011, this is often used to supply two to four USB 3.0 ports with the full 0.9 A (4.5 W) of power that each USB 3.0 port is capable of (while also transmitting data), whereas the PCI Express slot itself cannot supply the required amount of power.

If faster connections to storage devices are the reason to consider USB 3.0, an alternative is to use eSATAp, possibly by adding an inexpensive expansion slot bracket that provides an eSATAp port; some external hard disk drives provide both USB (2.0 or 3.0) and eSATAp interfaces. To ensure compatibility between motherboards and peripherals, all USB-certified devices must be approved by the USB Implementers Forum (USB-IF). At least one complete end-to-end test system for USB 3.0 designers is available on the market.

Adoption
The USB Promoter Group announced the release of USB 3.0 in November 2008. On 5 January 2010, the USB-IF announced the first two certified USB 3.0 motherboards, one by ASUS and one by Giga-Byte Technology.  Previous announcements included Gigabyte's October 2009 list of seven P55 chipset USB 3.0 motherboards, and an Asus motherboard that was cancelled before production.

Commercial controllers were expected to enter into volume production in the first quarter of 2010. On 14 September 2009, Freecom announced a USB 3.0 external hard drive. On 4 January 2010, Seagate announced a small portable HDD bundled with an additional USB 3.0 ExpressCard, targeted for laptops (or desktops with ExpressCard slot addition) at the CES in Las Vegas Nevada.

The Linux kernel mainline contains support for USB 3.0 since version 2.6.31, which was released in September 2009.

FreeBSD supports USB 3.0 since version 8.2, which was released in February 2011.

Windows 8 was the first Microsoft operating system to offer built in support for USB 3.0. In Windows 7 support was not included with the initial release of the operating system. However, drivers that enable support for Windows 7 are available through websites of hardware manufacturers.

Intel released its first chipset with integrated USB 3.0 ports in 2012 with the release of the Panther Point chipset.  Some industry analysts have claimed that Intel was slow to integrate USB 3.0 into the chipset, thus slowing mainstream adoption.  These delays may be due to problems in the CMOS manufacturing process, a focus to advance the Nehalem platform, a wait to mature all the 3.0 connections standards (USB 3.0, PCIe 3.0, SATA 3.0) before developing a new chipset, or a tactic by Intel to favor its new Thunderbolt interface.  Apple, Inc. announced laptops with USB 3.0 ports on 11 June 2012, nearly four years after USB 3.0 was finalized.

AMD began supporting USB 3.0 with its Fusion Controller Hubs in 2011. Samsung Electronics announced support of USB 3.0 with its ARM-based Exynos 5 Dual platform intended for handheld devices.

Issues

Speed and compatibility
Various early USB 3.0 implementations widely used the NEC/Renesas µD72020x family of host controllers, which are known to require a firmware update to function properly with some devices.

A factor affecting the speed of USB storage devices (more evident with USB 3.0 devices, but also noticeable with USB 2.0 ones) is that the USB Mass Storage Bulk-Only Transfer (BOT) protocol drivers are generally slower than the USB Attached SCSI protocol (UAS[P]) drivers.

On some old (2009–2010) Ibex Peak-based motherboards, the built-in USB 3.0 chipsets are connected by default via a 2.5 GT/s PCI Express lane of the PCH, which then did not provide full PCI Express 2.0 speed (5 GT/s), so it did not provide enough bandwidth even for a single USB 3.0 port. Early versions of such boards (e.g. the Gigabyte Technology P55A-UD4 or P55A-UD6) have a manual switch (in BIOS) that can connect the USB 3.0 chip to the processor (instead of the PCH), which did provide full-speed PCI Express 2.0 connectivity even then, but this meant using fewer PCI Express 2.0 lanes for the graphics card. However, newer boards (e.g. Gigabyte P55A-UD7 or the Asus P7P55D-E Premium) used a channel bonding technique (in the case of those boards provided by a PLX PEX8608 or PEX8613 PCI Express switch) that combines two PCI Express 2.5 GT/s lanes into a single PCI Express 5 GT/s lane (among other features), thus obtaining the necessary bandwidth from the PCH.

Radio frequency interference
USB 3.0 devices and cables may interfere with wireless devices operating in the 2.4 GHz ISM band. This may result in a drop in throughput or complete loss of response with Bluetooth and Wi-Fi devices. When manufacturers were unable to resolve the interference issues in time, some mobile devices, such as the Vivo Xplay 3S, had to drop support for USB 3.0 just before they shipped. Various strategies can be applied to resolve the problem, ranging from simple solutions such as increasing the distance of USB 3.0 devices from Wi-Fi routers and Bluetooth devices, to applying additional shielding around internal computer components.

Connectors

A USB 3.0 Standard-A receptacle accepts either a USB 3.0 Standard-A plug or a USB 2.0 Standard-A plug. Conversely, it is possible to plug a USB 3.0 Standard-A plug into a USB 2.0 Standard-A receptacle. This is a principle of backward compatibility. The Standard-A is used for connecting to a computer port, at the host side.

A USB 3.0 Standard-B receptacle accepts either a USB 3.0 Standard-B plug or a USB 2.0 Standard-B plug.  Backward compatibility applies to connecting a USB 2.0 Standard-B plug into a USB 3.0 Standard-B receptacle.  However, it is not possible to plug a USB 3.0 Standard-B plug into a USB 2.0 Standard-B receptacle, due to a physically larger connector.  The Standard-B is used at the device side.

Since USB 2.0 and USB 3.0 ports may coexist on the same machine and they look similar, the USB 3.0 specification recommends that the Standard-A USB 3.0 receptacle have a blue insert (Pantone 300C color).  The same color-coding applies to the USB 3.0 Standard-A plug.

USB 3.0 also introduced a new Micro-B cable plug, which consists of a standard USB 1.x/2.0 Micro-B cable plug, with an additional 5-pin plug "stacked" inside it. That way, the USB 3.0 Micro-B host connector preserved its backward compatibility with the USB 1.x/2.0 Micro-B cable plugs, allowing devices with USB 3.0 Micro-B ports to run at USB 2.0 speeds on USB 2.0 Micro-B cables.  However, it is not possible to plug a USB 3.0 Micro-B plug into a USB 2.0 Micro-B receptacle, due to a physically larger connector.

Pinouts

The connector has the same physical configuration as its predecessor but with five more pins.

The VBUS, D−, D+, and GND pins are required for USB 2.0 communication.  The five additional USB 3.0 pins are two differential pairs and one ground (GND_DRAIN).  The two additional differential pairs are for SuperSpeed data transfer; they are used for full duplex SuperSpeed signaling.  The GND_DRAIN pin is for drain wire termination and to control EMI and maintain signal integrity.

Backward compatibility

USB 3.0 and USB 2.0 (or earlier) Type-A plugs and receptacles are designed to interoperate.

USB 3.0 Type-B receptacles, such as those found on peripheral devices, are larger than in USB 2.0 (or earlier versions), and accept both the larger USB 3.0 Type-B plug and the smaller USB 2.0 (or earlier) Type-B plug.  USB 3.0 Type B plugs are larger than USB 2.0 (or earlier) Type-B plugs; therefore, USB 3.0 Type-B plugs cannot be inserted into USB 2.0 (or earlier) Type-B receptacles.

Micro USB 3.0 (Micro-B) plug and receptacle are intended primarily for small portable devices such as smartphones, digital cameras and GPS devices.  The Micro USB 3.0 receptacle is backward compatible with the Micro USB 2.0 plug.

A receptacle for eSATAp, which is an eSATA/USB combo, is designed to accept USB Type-A plugs from USB 2.0 (or earlier), so it also accepts USB 3.0 Type-A plugs.

USB 3.1

In January 2013 the USB group announced plans to update USB 3.0 to 10 Gbit/s (1250 MB/s). The group ended up creating a new USB specification, USB 3.1, which was released on 31 July 2013, replacing the USB 3.0 standard. The USB 3.1 specification takes over the existing USB 3.0's SuperSpeed USB transfer rate, now referred to as USB 3.1 Gen 1, and introduces a faster transfer rate called SuperSpeed USB 10 Gbps, referred to as USB 3.1 Gen 2, putting it on par with a single first-generation Thunderbolt channel. The new mode's logo features a caption stylized as SUPERSPEED+; this refers to the updated SuperSpeed Plus protocol. The USB 3.1 Gen 2 mode also reduces line encoding overhead to just 3% by changing the encoding scheme to 128b/132b, with effective data rate of 1,212 MB/s. The first USB 3.1 Gen 2 implementation demonstrated real-world transfer speeds of 7.2 Gbit/s.

The USB 3.1 standard is backward compatible with USB 3.0 and USB 2.0. It defines the following transfer modes:

 USB 3.1 Gen 1 – SuperSpeed, 5 Gbit/s data signaling rate over 1 lane using 8b/10b encoding (effective 500 MB/s); the same as USB 3.0
 USB 3.1 Gen 2 – SuperSpeed+, new 10 Gbit/s data rate over 1 lane using 128b/132b encoding (effective 1212 MB/s)

The nominal data rate in bytes accounts for bit-encoding overhead. The physical SuperSpeed bit rate is 5 Gbit/s. Since transmission of every byte takes 10 bit times, the raw data overhead is 20%, so the byte rate is 500 MB/s, not 625. Similarly, for Gen 2 link the encoding is 128b/132b, so transmission of 16 bytes physically takes 16.5 bytes, or 3% overhead. Therefore, the new byte-rate is 128/132 * 10 Gbit/s = 9.697 Gbit/s =  1212 MB/s. In reality the SuperSpeed+ mode has additional link management and protocol overhead, so the best-case achievable data rates are about 1100 MB/s.

This renaming of USB 3.0 as "USB 3.1 Gen 1" has allowed manufacturers to advertise products with transfer rates of only 5 Gbit/s as "USB 3.1," omitting the generation.

USB 3.2

On 25 July 2017, a press release from the USB 3.0 Promoter Group detailed a pending update to the USB Type-C specification, defining the doubling of bandwidth for existing USB-C cables. Under the USB 3.2 specification, released 22 September 2017, existing SuperSpeed certified USB-C 3.1 Gen 1 cables will be able to operate at 10 Gbit/s (up from 5 Gbit/s), and SuperSpeed+ certified USB-C 3.1 Gen 2 cables will be able to operate at 20 Gbit/s (up from 10 Gbit/s). The increase in bandwidth is a result of multi-lane operation over existing wires that were intended for flip-flop capabilities of the USB-C connector.

The USB 3.2 standard is backward compatible with USB 3.1/3.0 and USB 2.0. It defines the following transfer modes:
 USB 3.2 Gen 1 – SuperSpeed, 5 gigabit per second (Gbit/s) data signaling rate over 1 lane using 8b/10b encoding (effective 500 MB/s), the same as USB 3.1 Gen 1 and USB 3.0.
 USB 3.2 Gen 2 – SuperSpeed+, 10 gigabit per second (Gbit/s)  data rate over 1 lane using 128b/132b encoding (effective 1212 MB/s), the same as USB 3.1 Gen 2.
 USB 3.2 Gen 1×2 – SuperSpeed+, new 10 gigabit per second (Gbit/s) data rate over 2 lanes using 8b/10b encoding (effective 1000 MB/s).
 USB 3.2 Gen 2×2 – SuperSpeed+, new 20 gigabit per second (Gbit/s) data rate over 2 lanes using 128b/132b encoding (effective 2424 MB/s).

As with the previous version, the same considerations around encoding and effective data rates apply. Although both Gen 1×2 and Gen 2×1 signal at 10 Gbit/s, Gen 1×2 uses the older, less efficient 8b/10b line coding which results in a lower effective speed, with the newer SuperSpeed+ protocol.

In May 2018, Synopsys demonstrated the first USB 3.2 Gen 2×2 connection, where a Windows PC was connected to a storage device, reaching an average speed of 1600 MB/s.

USB 3.2 is supported with the default Windows 10 USB drivers and in Linux kernels 4.18 and onwards.

In February 2019, USB-IF simplified the marketing guidelines by excluding Gen 1×2 mode and required the SuperSpeed trident logos to include maximum transfer speed.

All USB connectors except USB-C were deprecated in USB 3.2.

See also

 USB4
Computer bus
 Extensible Host Controller Interface (XHCI)
 
 Mobile High-Definition Link

References

External links

  CES 2014 report of a laptop docking port using a single USB 3.1 port to supply power, video and USB peripherals

3.0
Computer-related introductions in 2008